Maria Teresa Riedl (14 December 1937 – 12 May 1995) was a tennis player from Italy.

Biography
She won eight medals at the Summer Universiade from 1959 to 1965.

Achievements

References

External links
 
 
 Vecchie Glorie del Tennis 

1937 births
1995 deaths
Italian female tennis players
Universiade medalists in tennis
People from Gorizia
Universiade gold medalists for Italy
Universiade bronze medalists for Italy
Grand Slam (tennis) champions in girls' singles
French Championships junior (tennis) champions
Medalists at the 1959 Summer Universiade
Medalists at the 1961 Summer Universiade
Medalists at the 1963 Summer Universiade
Medalists at the 1965 Summer Universiade
Sportspeople from Friuli-Venezia Giulia
20th-century Italian women